A. H. G. Dawson was the 16th Surveyor General of Ceylon. He was appointed in 1927, succeeding A. J. Wickwar, and held the office until 1932. He was succeeded by G. K. Thornhill.

References

D